TriTech Software Systems, formerly known as American Tritech, is a public safety software company based in San Diego, California, with offices in San Ramon, California; Hillsboro, Oregon; Decorah, Iowa; Castle Hayne, North Carolina; Melville, New York; Marlborough, Massachusetts; and Montreal, Quebec, Canada.

History
TriTech was founded in 1991 in San Diego, California by Christopher D. Maloney. Chris interned at San Diego emergency transport company where he saw the need for a more efficient dispatch paradigm. TriTech’s first products were for the emergency transport market and was originally named American TriTech but was renamed in 1998 to TriTech Software Systems, as the company's business was not limited to the United States. In 2018, TriTech merged with three other public sector software companies to form CentralSquare Technologies.

Products
TriTech supports five distinct product lines. TriTech is considered to a key player in security control room market. In 2020, Chicago announced Computer Aided Dispatch, Mobile and Analytics software by TriTech for its 9-1-1 Center.

See also

 Computer-aided dispatch
 Emergency medical services

References

Companies based in San Diego
Software companies based in California
Law enforcement equipment
Defunct software companies of the United States
Software companies established in 1991
1991 establishments in California